Damada is a village and seat of the commune of Metoumou in the Cercle of Bandiagara in the Mopti Region of southern-central Mali.

References

Populated places in Mopti Region